was a hill top castle located at Ibaraki, Osaka, Japan. It was burned to the ground in 1657.

Literature
 『日本城郭大系（第12巻、大阪・兵庫）』 新人物従来社, Mar.,1981 (Japanese) 
 『わがまち茨木（城郭編）』 茨木市教育委員会, Mar.,1987 (Japanese)

External links

Castles in Osaka Prefecture